Frederick II, Margrave of Baden (died 22 June 1333) was the ruling Margrave of Baden-Eberstein from 1291 until his death. He was the son of Herman VII of Baden and Agnes of Trunhendingen (d. after 15 March 1309).

He married twice. He married before 16 October 1312 to Agnes of Weinberg (d. 3 May 1320). After her death, he married Margaret of Vaihingen (d. 1348). He had the following children:
 Herman IX (d. 13 April 1353), married before 3 June 1341 to Matilda of Vaihingen (d, 13 April 1381)
 Frederick
 Agnes, (d. 1361), abbess of the Lichtenthal Abbey
 Irmgard, a nun in Lichtenthal Abbey
 Marie, another nun in Lichtenthal Abbey
His son Herman IX was from his first marriage. It is not clear into which marriage the other children were born.

See also 
 List of rulers of Baden

Margraves of Baden
13th-century births
1333 deaths
13th-century German nobility
14th-century German nobility